Marking out or layout means the process of transferring a design or pattern to a workpiece, as the first step in the manufacturing process. It is performed in many industries or hobbies although in the repetition industries the machine's initial setup is designed to remove the need to mark out every individual piece.

Manufacturing

Marking out consists of transferring the dimensions from the plan to the workpiece in preparation for the next step, machining or manufacture.

Typical tools include:
 Surface plate or marking out table — provides a true surface from which to work
 Angle plates — assist in holding the workpiece perpendicular to the table
 Scriber — is the equivalent of a pen or pencil. It literally scratches the metal surface leaving behind a fine, bright line
 Height gauge or scribing block — allows lines to be scribed at a preset distance, from the tables surface
 Surface gauge — an ungraduated comparison measuring tool that performs much the same function as the vernier height gauge.  It is often used in conjunction with a dial indicator and a precision height gauge.
 Marking blue — to provide a usable writing surface by covering any existing scratches and providing a contrasting background
 Profile gauge
 Protractor — to assist in the transfer of angular measurements
 Combination square — an alternative tool for transferring angular measurements
 Square — to transfer 90° angles to the workpiece
 Punches — either prick or center punch to create permanent marks or dimples for drill bits to start in
 Automatic center punch — a spring-loaded punch that creates prick punch marks without the need for a ball peen hammer
 Ball peen hammer — used in conjunction with the punches to provide the striking blow needed
 Dividers or measuring compass — used for marking out circles of any desired radius,

Welding
As welding does not always require the use of fine tolerances, marking out is usually performed by using centre punches, hammers, tape measures and chalk.

The "chalk" is actually a small pre-cut block of talc (soapstone). These talc blocks can be sharpened to a stronger point than the softer blackboard chalk. The color of the chalk provides good contrast against the dark color of the hot rolled steel that is generally used.

Woodworking

In carpentry and joinery practice a pencil is used for marking while in cabinetmaking a marking knife provides for greater accuracy. A storey pole is used to lay out repeated measurements such as the location of joints in timber framing, courses of siding such as wood shingles and clapboards, the heights of doorjambs and the courses of bricks in masonry. Carpenters typically mark out framing members on-center, the measurements are to the centers of each member.

References

Metalworking measuring instruments
Woodworking